Donaldo Alfonso Méndez (born June 7, 1978) is a former professional baseball player. A shortstop, he played parts of two seasons in Major League Baseball for the San Diego Padres in 2001 and 2003.

In a two-year career, Méndez was a .183 hitter with three home runs and 14 RBI in 72 games, but showed strong fielding skills. He finished his career playing for the Long Island Ducks of the independent Atlantic League in 2008.

See also
 List of Major League Baseball players from Venezuela

References

External links
, or Retrosheet, or Pura Pelota (VPBL)

1978 births
Living people
Águilas del Zulia players
Altoona Curve players
Auburn Doubledays players
Cardenales de Lara players
Fresno Grizzlies players
Gulf Coast Astros players
Gulf Coast Pirates players
Kansas City T-Bones players
Kissimmee Cobras players
Leones del Caracas players
Long Island Ducks players
Major League Baseball players from Venezuela
Major League Baseball shortstops
Michigan Battle Cats players
Mobile BayBears players
Navegantes del Magallanes players
Newark Bears players
Sportspeople from Barquisimeto
Portland Beavers players
Rochester Red Wings players
San Diego Padres players
Venezuelan expatriate baseball players in the United States